Sadie Goes to Heaven is a 1917 American silent comedy film directed by W.S. Van Dyke and starring Mary McAllister, Frances Raymond and Rod La Rocque

Cast
 Mary McAllister as Sadie 
 Jenny St. George as Sadie's Mother
 Russell McDermott as Orval
 Frances Raymond as Mrs. Welland Riche 
 Rod La Rocque as Coal Heaver
 Kathryn Kennedy as Housekeeper
 Robert Bolder as Butler

References

Bibliography
 Connelly, Robert B. The Silents: Silent Feature Films, 1910-36, Volume 40, Issue 2. December Press, 1998.

External links
 

1917 films
1917 comedy films
1910s English-language films
American silent feature films
Silent American comedy films
American black-and-white films
Films directed by W. S. Van Dyke
Essanay Studios films
1910s American films